VC Slivnishki Geroy (Slivnitsa) is a volleyball club from the town of Slivnitsa, Bulgaria, established in 2015 with the president of the club being the former volleyball player and national coach of Bulgaria Martin Stoev. Participant in the elite volleyball Bulgarian Volleyball Efbet Super League.

In the 2020/2021 Season, the team competes in the Bulgarian Volleyball League Zone A, after winning the Northwest Zone Group in the 2016/2017 Season, which entitles it to participate in a higher group. The coach of the team is Martin Stoev and the captain is Eric Stoev.

Current Squad 2021/2022 
Head Manager  Martin Stoev
 Assistant Manager  Alexander Popov
  Eric Stoev (Captain)
  Stoil Palev
  Valeri Todorov
  Metodi Ananiev
  Teodor Manchev
  Emil Iliev
  Georgi Levenov
  Ivan Tasev
  Pavel Dushkov
  Kostadin Stoykov
  Marian Nakov
  Boris Dimov
  Georgi Mitov

Notable players
  Metodi Ananiev
  Velislav Yonev
  Kostadin Stoykov

References

Bulgarian volleyball clubs